Jiayu may refer to:

 Jiayu Pass, the first pass at the west end of the Great Wall of China
 Jiayu County, in Xianning, Hubei, China
 Kongzi Jiayu, or The School Sayings of Confucius
 Jia Yu Channel, a Malaysian Chinese-language pay-TV channel
 Jiayu Town (贾峪镇) in the Prefecture-level city of Xingyang in Henan province, China